Coenyropsis carcassoni is a butterfly in the family Nymphalidae. It is found in south-eastern Kenya and eastern Tanzania. The habitat consists of Brachystegia woodland and savanna.

References

Satyrini
Butterflies described in 1976